Sally Elizabeth Thorne PhD, FAAN, FCAHS, RN (born 1951) is a Canadian academic nursing teacher, researcher and author. She researched the human experience of chronic illness and cancer, and  qualitative research methodologies including metasynthesis and interpretive description.

Biography and career
Thorne obtained her RN Diploma (1972) from the Atkinson School of Nursing at Toronto Western Hospital, BSN (1979) and MSN (1983) from the University of British Columbia School of Nursing, in Vancouver, Canada, and PhD from the Union Institute for Advanced Studies (1990), now the Union Institute & University, in Cincinnati, OH, USA.

Thorne joined the faculty of the University of British Columbia School of Nursing in 1983, and established a research program and methodological development in the area of health service delivery for patients with cancer and chronic disease.

From 2002 until 2010, Thorne served as the Director of the School. Since 2011, she has resumed an academic career, including political activities on behalf of the profession and a program of scholarship in advancing communication systems in cancer care. She currently serves as Associate Dean, Faculty of Applied Science, speaks and consults internationally, and sits on numerous Boards and committees. She is associate editor of the journal Qualitative Health Research and Editor-in-Chief of Nursing Inquiry.

Theories and methods
 Interpretive Description: A qualitative research method which “provides a bridge between objective neutrality and abject theorizing” designed for the needs of the applied disciplines.

 Communication in Cancer Care: A program of research dedicated to supporting effective communication between cancer patients and health care professionals
 The Social Context of Chronic Illness: A program of patient-perspective research addressing system barriers to effective care for chronic diseases.
 Philosophy of Nursing Science: A program of philosophical inquiry dealing with matters of the nature of nursing, the nature of evidence claims related to human health complexity, and the theoretical traditions that underpin current thinking within the discipline.

Books
 Thorne, S.E. (1993). Negotiating Health Care: The Social Context of Chronic Illness. Newbury Park, CA: Sage.
 Thorne, S.E. & Hayes, V.E. (1997). Nursing Praxis: Knowledge and Action. Thousand Oaks, CA: Sage
 Paterson, B., Thorne, S., Canam, C. & Jillings, C. (2001). Meta-Study of Qualitative Health Research: A Practical Guide to Meta-Analysis and Meta-Synthesis. Thousand Oaks, CA: Sage Publications
 Thorne, S. (2008). Interpretive description. Walnut Creek, CA: Left Coast Press

Awards and recognition
 Award of Distinction, Registered Nurses Association of British Columbia, 1999
 Fellow, Canadian Academy of Health Sciences, 2005
 Canada’s Top 100 Most Powerful Women Award, Women’s Executive Network, 2009
 Pfizer Award of Excellence for Nursing Research, Canadian Association of Nurses in Oncology, 2011
 Fellow, American Academy of Nursing, 2011
 Honorary doctorate, Queen's University, 2013
 Ethel Johns Award, Canadian Association of Schools of Nursing, 2013

References

External links
Faculty information - Sally Thorne. The University of British Columbia. Retrieved June 22, 2016.

Canadian nurses
Canadian women nurses
Living people
Nursing researchers
Nursing educators
Nursing theorists
Nursing school deans
Canadian academic administrators
1951 births
Academic journal editors